Delanie is the name of:

 Delanie Forbes (born 1976), English actress
 Delanie Gourley (born 1995), American softball pitcher 
 Delanie Walker (born 1984), American football tight end
 Delanie Wiedrich (born 1996), American beauty pageant titleholder

See also
 Delaney (disambiguation)